Ching, chang, chong is a pejorative term mocking the Chinese language.

Ching Chang Chong may also refer to:

 "Ching Chang Chong", a 2009 song by the band Cherona from their album Sound of Cherona
 "Ching Chang Chong", a 2010 song by Rucka Rucka Ali from his album I'm Black, You're White & These Are Clearly Parodies

See also
 "Ching Chong Chang", an episode from season three of Orange Is the New Black
 Zhing-zhong, a Zimbabwean slang word for Chinese products of poor quality